Maria Gromova may refer to:

 Mariya Gromova (born 1984), Russian synchronized swimmer
 Maria Gromova (swimmer) (born 1988), Russian backstroke and relay swimmer
 Maria Gromova, one of a number of purported Soviet cosmonauts named in the Lost Cosmonauts conspiracy theory